White Girl Bleed a Lot: The Return of Racial Violence to America and How the Media Ignore It is a 2012 book by Colin Flaherty. It deals with race and crime in the United States, particularly the knockout game, violent flash mobs, and black-on-white crime. It was first published by CreateSpace.
The books title relates to a quote during a alleged racially motivated series of assaults during 2011 4th July in Milwaukee

Response
Thomas Sowell praised the book in the National Review, linking it to his own Intellectuals and Society, and suggested that the book and its message were being ignored or silenced. Radio show host Larry Elder wrote that according to Flaherty's book "the knockout game has gone national." Cathy Young in Newsday brought up the book when discussing the knockout game, and mentioned how she felt Flaherty, while in error in a particular case, brings forth a "narrative [that] raises a painful question" about the media's failure to report incidents accurately when perpetrators are black. That failure, she cautions, undermines the media's credibility and actually risks encouraging racist paranoia.

Flaherty's work has also drawn journalistic and scholarly criticism. Alex Pareene, the editor of Gawker, after checking the sources cited, claimed in Salon that the figures presented by Flaherty were inflated and the reporting misleading. In the Los Angeles Times, Robin Abcarian also wrote that Flaherty's numbers were out of proportion, feeling that Flaherty, amongst other conservative media personalities, was only trying to incite anxiety. Leah Nelson, writing for the Southern Poverty Law Center's Hatewatch blog, noted Flaherty's column at WorldNetDaily and labeled him a "white nationalist propagandist." In The Huffington Post, Terry Kreppel of Media Matters for America, criticized Flaherty, in his postings on WND, and called his postings and book race baiting.

References 

2012 non-fiction books
Political books
Books about race and ethnicity
Race and crime in the United States
Works about crime in the United States
English-language books
American non-fiction books
Works about White Americans
CreateSpace books